Bothriurus is a genus of Neotropical scorpions in the family Bothriuridae. They occur in many different habitats in South America, including deserts, steppes, savannas and forests.

Species
The following species are included in the genus Bothriurus:

 Bothriurus aguardente Santos-da-Silva, Carvalho & Brescovit, 2017
 Bothriurus araguayae Vellard, 1934
 Bothriurus asper Pocock, 1893
 Bothriurus bertae Abalos, 1955
 Bothriurus bocki Kraepelin, 1911
 Bothriurus bonariensis (C. L. Koch, 1842)
 Bothriurus buecherli San Martín, 1934
 Bothriurus burmeisteri Kraepelin, 1894
 Bothriurus ceii Ojanguren Affilastro, 2007
 Bothriurus cerradoensis Lourenço et al., 2004
 Bothriurus chacoensis Maury & Acosta, 1993
 Bothriurus chilensis (Molina, 1782)
 Bothriurus cordubensis Acosta, 1955
 Bothriurus coriaceus Pocock, 1893
 Bothriurus delmari Santos-da-Silva, Carvalho & Brescovit, 2017
 Bothriurus dumayi (Cekalovic, 1974)
 Bothriurus flavidus Kraepelin, 1911
 Bothriurus guarani Maury, 1984
 Bothriurus huincul Mattoni, 2007
 Bothriurus illudens Mello-Leitão, 1947
 Bothriurus inermis Maury, 1981
 Bothriurus jesuita Ojanguren Affilastro, 2003
 Bothriurus keyserlingi Pocock, 1893
 Bothriurus maculatus Kraepelin, 1911
 Bothriurus mochaensis Cekalovic, 1982
 Bothriurus moojeni Mello-Leitão, 1945
 Bothriurus nendai Ojanguren Affilastro & Garcia-Mauro, 2010
 Bothriurus noa Maury, 1984
 Bothriurus olaen Acosta, 1997
 Bothriurus pampa Ojanguren Affilastro, 2002
 Bothriurus patagonicus Maury, 1968
 Bothriurus pichicuy Mattoni, 2002
 Bothriurus picunche Mattoni, 2002
 Bothriurus pora Mattoni & Acosta, 2005
 Bothriurus prospicuus Mello-Leitão, 1932
 Bothriurus rochai Mello-Leitão, 1932
 Bothriurus rochensis San Martín, 1965
 Bothriurus rubescens Mello-Leitão, 1947
 Bothriurus sanctacrucis Mattoni, 2007
 Bothriurus signatus Pocock, 1893
 Bothriurus sooretamensis San Martín, 1966
 Bothriurus trivittatus Werner, 1939
 Bothriurus vachoni San Martín, 1968
 Bothriurus vittatus (Guerin Meneville, 1838)
 Bothriurus voyati Maury, 1973
 Bothriurus ypsilon Mello-Leitão, 1935

References

External links
Comportamiento Sexual y Reproducción de Bothriurus Bonariensis - 1959 film made by Lucrecia Covelo

Bothriuridae
Scorpion genera
Scorpions of South America